Cry of the Innocent is a 1980 American-Irish television film directed by Michael O'Herlihy and starring Rod Taylor, Joanna Pettet and Nigel Davenport. It was based on a story by Frederick Forsyth.

Plot
An American insurance executive seeks vengeance for the death of his wife and child in Ireland.

Cast
 Rod Taylor ...  Steve Donegin
 Joanna Pettet ...  Cynthia Donegin / Candia Leighton
 Nigel Davenport ...  Gray Harrison Hunt
 Cyril Cusack ...  Detective Inspector Tom Moloney
 Walter Gotell ...  Jack Brewster
 Jim Norton ...  Jasper Tooms
 Alexander Knox ...  Thornton Donegin
 Joe Cahill ...  Fritz Grossman
 May Ollis ...  Martha
 Bairbre Dowling ...  Maureen
 Des Cave ...  Supt. Flannagan
 Ronnie Walsh ...  Pete Medwin
 Tom Jordan ...  Buck Haggerty
 John Franklyn ...  Capo
 Des Nealon ...  Tooms #2
 Michael O'Sullivan ...  Young Garda Officer Gordon
 James N. Healy ...  Garda sergeant
 Fidelma Murphy ...  Lady clerk
 Maire O'Neill ...  Hotel manageress
 Philip Bollard ...  Steven Donegin Jr.
 Alison McCormack ...  Melody Donegin

Production
The film was shot in Ireland on a budget of one million dollars, financed by NBC. There were plans for a sequel but these did not eventuate.

Public domain
This movie is in the public domain.

References

External links

American television films
1980 television films
1980 films
Films directed by Michael O'Herlihy
1980s English-language films